Donald Worthington Reynolds (September 23, 1906 – April 2, 1993) was an American businessman and philanthropist. During his lifetime, he was known for his involvement in the Donrey Media Group.

Biography

Reynolds was the son of Gaines W. Reynolds, a wholesale grocery salesman, and his wife, Anna Louise. Born in Forth Worth, Texas, he grew up in Oklahoma City, Oklahoma and got his first job in the newspaper business selling papers at the local railroad station.

In high school, Reynolds decided he wanted to attend the University of Missouri's Missouri School of Journalism, and he worked during high school and successive summers at a meat packing plant to pay for his studies. While at the University of Missouri, he was initiated into Pi Kappa Alpha. He graduated in 1927.

Reynolds' first business venture was a photo engraving plant. He then purchased and sold the Quincy Evening News in Massachusetts, using the proceeds from that sale to buy the Okmulgee Daily Times in Oklahoma and the Southwest Times Record in Arkansas. Those two papers launched the Donrey Media Group.  Operating mostly in small towns, the group grew to include more than 100 businesses, including newspapers, radio stations, television stations, cable television operations, and billboard companies.  Perhaps his biggest success came with the ownership of the Las Vegas Review-Journal, the largest newspaper in Nevada.

Reynolds interrupted his newspaper career to serve in the military during World War II, initially in military intelligence and, later, as the officer in charge of the Pacific and London editions of the "soldiers' newspaper, Yank, the Army Weekly. He attained the rank of Major, received the Legion of Merit, Purple Heart and Bronze Star Medal during his military service, and returned to civilian status in 1945.

He focused his business acumen on businesses located in small but growth-oriented communities, and these communities often were the recipients of the Foundation's earliest charitable grants.

Reynolds died on April 2, 1993, on a cruise ship, on the Mediterranean Sea, at the age of 86. A large sum of money from his business ventures went to the Donald W. Reynolds Foundation.

There are currently a number of buildings named for Reynolds, including:

 The Donald W Reynolds Community Center in Seminole, Oklahoma
 The Donald W Reynolds Community Center & Water Park in Pauls Valley, Oklahoma
 Donald W. Reynolds Campus and Community Center at Southern Arkansas University
 The Donald W. Reynolds Razorback Stadium
 The Donald W. Reynolds Cancer Support House in Fort Smith, Arkansas
 The Donald W. Reynolds Center for Life Sciences at Hendrix College
 The Donald W. Reynolds Institute on Aging at the University of Arkansas for Medical Sciences in Little Rock, AR
 The Reynolds Center at Harding University
 The Donald W. Reynolds Performing Arts Center at the University of Oklahoma,
 The Donald W. Reynolds Performance Hall at the University of Central Arkansas
 The Donald W. Reynolds YMCA in Warren, Arkansas
 The Donald W. Reynolds Alumni Center and the Donald W. Reynolds Journalism Institute at the Missouri School of Journalism
 The Donald W. Reynolds School of Journalism at the University of Nevada, Reno
 The Donald W. Reynolds Center at the University of Tulsa
 The Donald W. Reynolds Community Center in Poteau, Oklahoma
 The Donald W. Reynolds Center for Business and Economic Development at the University of Arkansas at Little Rock
 The Donald W. Reynolds Science Center at Henderson State University
 The Donald W. Reynolds School of Architecture at Oklahoma State University
 The Donald W. Reynolds Technology Center at Oklahoma State University Institute of Technology in Okmulgee, OK
 The Donald W. Reynolds Center for American Art and Portraiture in Washington, DC.
 The Donald W. Reynolds Emergency Shelter and Recreation building at the Northwest Arkansas Children's Shelter, and
 The Donald W. Reynolds Museum and Education Center at the Mount Vernon estate of George Washington in Virginia
 The Donald W. Reynolds Library in Mountain Home, Arkansas
 The Donald W. Reynolds Center at Arkansas State University Mid-South in West Memphis, AR
 The Donald W. Reynolds Center for Health Sciences on the Arkansas State University campus in Jonesboro, AR
 The Donald W Reynolds Community Center and Library in Durant, Oklahoma
The Donald W. Reynolds Cultural Center at Nevada Ballet Theatre in Las Vegas, NV

Reynolds left three children on his death: Nancy, Donald and Jonathan. Forbes Magazine notes that Reynolds's three children will receive trust income of $50,000 a year for life, but will be left only $1 if they unsuccessfully contest his will. The bulk of the Estate was left to The Donald W Reynolds Foundation.

The Donald W. Reynolds Foundation continued his lengthy legacy of charitable giving through 2015, funding programs for capital grants, aging and quality of life, cardiovascular clinical research, and journalism. In accordance with its articles of incorporation, the Foundation was designated to terminate rather than continue in perpetuity. Its board of trustees determined that the foundation would cease to make grants by the year 2022. In fact, the foundation liquidated its assets and closed its doors at the end of 2017.

Awards
1978, The Oklahoma Journalism Hall of Fame 
1985, Golden Plate Award of the American Academy of Achievement
2000, Arkansas Business Hall of Fame

References

 https://web.archive.org/web/20141022112518/http://www.dwreynolds.org/Reynolds.htm
 http://www.onlinenevada.org/articles/donald-worthington-reynolds

External links
 Donald W. Reynolds Foundation
 Papers 1945–1994 at the State Historical Society of Missouri

1906 births
1993 deaths
American newspaper chain founders
People from Fort Smith, Arkansas
People from Fort Worth, Texas
Recipients of the Legion of Merit
Missouri School of Journalism alumni
People who died at sea
Businesspeople from Oklahoma City
Businesspeople from Texas
20th-century American businesspeople
Journalists from Texas
20th-century American philanthropists
20th-century American journalists
American male journalists